RKG may refer to:
 Reichskammergericht, Imperial chamber court of the Holy Roman Empire
 Reichskriegsgericht, German military law
 RKG-3 anti-tank grenade
 RK Gorenje (Gorenje Velenje Handball Club), a team handball club from Velenje, Slovenia